Here follows a list of notable people associated with Occidental College in Los Angeles, California. This list includes alumni, attendees, faculty, and presidents of the university.

Notable graduates and attendees

Business and industry
 John Branca (entertainment industry lawyer)
 Norton Clapp (an original owner of Space Needle)
 Stephen Cooper (CEO of Warner Music Group)
 W. Don Cornwell (CEO of Granite Broadcasting)
 Marsha J. Evans (CEO of American Red Cross, Navy admiral)
 Frank Hershey (automotive designer)
 Arthur Peck (CEO of Gap Inc.) 
 Linda Bradford Raschke (commodities and futures trader)

Entertainment and the arts

 Ben Affleck (actor, director, screenwriter)
 Stephen Beal (visual artist)
 Ashly Burch (actress)
 John Callas (writer, director, producer)
 August Coppola (academic, author, film executive and advocate for the arts)
 Glenn Corbett (television actor)
 Gabriela Cowperthwaite (documentary filmmaker, Blackfish)
 Will Friedle (actor)
 Terry Gilliam (animator and comedian in Monty Python comedy troupe; filmmaker: Brazil, 12 Monkeys, others)
 Joanna Gleason (actor)
 Mike Hoover (cameraman, journalist, documentarian, winner of Academy and Emmy Awards)
 Terry Kitchen (musician)
 Loren Lester (actor)
 Thomas Murray (organist)
 George Nader (actor)
 Marcel Ophüls (filmmaker)
 Emily Osment (actress; Class of 2015)
 Cooper Raiff (actor, director)
 Joe Rohde (Imagineer)
 Peter Scolari (actor)
 Jake Shears (lead singer of Scissor Sisters)
 Anna Slotky (actress)
 Dan Slott (comic book writer)
 Kirsten Smith (screenwriter, Ten Things I Hate About You, Legally Blonde, The Ugly Truth)
 Roger Guenveur Smith (actor)
 Rider Strong (actor)
 Taku Takahashi (musician)
 Maurissa Tancharoen (actress, singer, dancer, television writer and lyricist)
 Jesús Salvador Treviño (television director)
 Tui St. George Tucker (composer)
 Luke Wilson (actor)
 Michael Whaley (actor, director, writer)

Government, diplomacy, and law
 Kathy Augustine (U.S. politician from Nevada)
 Alphonzo E. Bell, Jr. (U.S. Congressman)
 David S. Cunningham, Jr. (Los Angeles City Council member, 1973–87)
 Gloria Duffy (President and CEO of The Commonwealth Club, former Deputy Asst Sec Def,  and Special Coordinator for Cooperative Threat Reduction)
 Richard Falkenrath (former deputy homeland security advisor)
 Robert Finch (Secretary of Health, Education and Welfare 1969—1970, Lieutenant Governor of California 1967—1969)
 U. Alexis Johnson (U.S. diplomat)

 Jack Kemp (AFL and NFL player from 1958–1970, U.S. Representative from New York 1971-1989, U.S. Secretary Department of Housing and Urban Development 1989-1993, Republican Vice Presidential nominee in 1996) Awarded Presidential Medal of Freedom, 2009.
 David M. Louie (Attorney General of Hawaii)
 Pete McCloskey (U.S. Representative 1967-83)
 Jacqueline Nguyen (federal judge, United States Court of Appeals for the Ninth Circuit)
 Chris Norby (California State Assemblyman)

 Barack Obama (44th President of the United States)
 Dennis R. Patrick (Chairman of the Federal Communications Commission, 1987 - 1989)
 Thomas M. Rees (U.S. Congressman)
 Janette Sadik-Khan (commissioner, New York City Department of Transportation)
 Janis Lynn Sammartino (federal judge, United States District Court for the Southern District of California)
 Mark S. Scarberry (professor of law at Pepperdine University School of Law)
 Kristina A Kvien (Chargé d’Affaires ad interim, U.S. Embassy Kyiv)
 Grant Woods (Arizona Attorney General)

Higher education and academia
 Coit D. Blacker (Political Science Professor at Stanford University)
 Glenn S. Dumke (history professor and chancellor of the California State University)
 Sharon Gaber (President of the University of Toledo)
 Karen L. Gould (President of Brooklyn College)
 Lewis Sargentich (legal scholar at Harvard Law School)

Journalism

 Bessie Beatty (1886-1947), reported on Russian Revolution
 Steve Coll (former Washington Post managing editor, Pulitzer Prize winner)
 Andrea Elliott (reporter for The New York Times, Pulitzer Prize winner)
 Chris Gulker (photographer)
 Margot Mifflin (professor of journalism, feminist cultural critic)
 James Andrew Miller reporter for Washington Post, author of oral histories on ESPN, CAA
 Patt Morrison (NPR radio personality and columnist for the Los Angeles Times)
 Sam Rubin (KTLA entertainment anchor)

Literature and writing
 Mark Dery (author and cultural critic)
 M. F. K. Fisher (writer)
 Robinson Jeffers (poet)
 Scott O'Dell (author, Newbery Award winner)
 Carrie Vaughn (writer)
 Gladys Waddingham (teacher and local historian)
 Rosalind Wiseman (writer)

Medicine
 David G. Armstrong (physician/medical researcher)
 Howard Judd (medical researcher)

Science
 Brent Dalrymple (geologist and National Medal of Science winner)
 William Goddard (engineer)
 Edmund C. Jaeger (naturalist, author, teacher)
 J. P. Mallory (archaeologist)
 John E. McCosker (ichthyologist)
 Fred Lawrence Whipple (astronomer)

Social action, philanthropy, and community service
 Howard Ahmanson, Jr (philanthropist, financier, and writer)
 Cameron Townsend (founder, Wycliffe Bible Translators and Summer Institute of Linguistics)
 Rex Weyler (author, journalist, ecologist and co-founder of Greenpeace International; did not graduate)

Sports and athletics
 Keith Beebe, football player
 Ron Botchan, five-time Super Bowl official for NFL from 1980 to 2002
 Olin Browne, PGA Tour winner
 Dean Cromwell, USC and Olympic track-and-field coach
 Luke Collis, arena football player
 Joe Faust, Olympic high jumper
 Justin Goltz, NFL/CFL quarterback
 Bob Gutowski, pole vaulter, 1956 Olympic silver medalist
 Jack Kemp, AFL and NFL star quarterback of Buffalo Bills
 Sammy Lee, two-time Olympic gold medalist in diving
 Jim Mora, Sr., coached NFL's New Orleans Saints and Indianapolis Colts
 Vance Mueller, NFL running back
 Bill Redell, college and pro quarterback, high school coach
 Johnny Sanders, NFL general manager
 Danny Southwick, arena football player
 Jim Tunney, NFL official from 1960–1991; three Super Bowls

Notable faculty
 Martha Ronk, Price Professor of English Literature, is a 2005 PEN American Center Literary Award winner in poetry.
 Peter Dreier, Dr. E.P. Clapp Distinguished Professor of Politics and director of the Urban and Environmental Policy Department, was the Director of Housing at the Boston Redevelopment Authority and senior policy advisor to Boston Mayor Ray Flynn for nine years.

 Eric Garcetti, former assistant professor of Diplomacy and World Affairs; currently mayor of Los Angeles
 George R. Goldner, art historian, Drue Heinz Chairman of the Department of Drawings and Paints of the Metropolitan Museum of Art
 Julia Holter, singer-songwriter, record producer, composer, artist; appointed Professor of the Practice of Songwriting in 2021.
 Derek Shearer, director of the McKinnon Center for Global Affairs and Chevalier Professor of Diplomacy and World Affairs, is former United States Ambassador to Finland.

Presidents

Samuel H. Weller (1887–1891)
J. Melville McPherron (1892–1894)
Elbert Nevius Condit (1894–1896)
James W. Parkhill (1896–1897)
Guy W. Wadsworth (1897–1905)
William Stewart Young (1905–1906, acting)
John Willis Baer (1906–1916)
Thomas Gregory Burt (1916–1917)
Silas Evans (1917–1920)
Thomas Gregory Burt (1920–1921, acting)
Remsen Bird (1921–1927, 1928–1945)
Robert G. Cleland (1927–1928, acting)
Arthur G. Coons (1945–1965)
Richard C. Gilman (1965–1988)
John Brooks Slaughter (1988–1999)
Theodore R. Mitchell (1999–2005)
Kenyon S. Chan (2005–2006, acting)
Susan Westerberg Prager (2006–2007)
Robert Skotheim (2008–2009)
Jonathan Veitch (2009–2020)
Harry J. Elam Jr. (2020–present)

References

Occidental College